Beach wrestling at the 2019 World Beach Games in Doha, Qatar was held on 14 and 15 October 2019. The competitions were held on Katara Beach.

In February 2021, the gold medal won by Pouya Rahmani of Iran (men's +90 kg) and the silver medal won by Mercy Genesis of Nigeria (women's 50 kg) were forfeited due to anti-doping rule violations. The Association of National Olympic Committees (ANOC) subsequently reallocated the medals.

Medalists

References

External links
Results book

Beach wrestling
World Beach Games
Wrestling in Qatar